Bachman is an unincorporated community in Montgomery County, in the U.S. state of Ohio.

History
Bachman was named for its founder, C. Bachman. A post office called Bachman was established in 1863, and remained in operation until 1911. In 1909, Bachman had about 60 inhabitants.

Notable person
Trader Horne, a Major League Baseball pitcher, was born at Bachman in 1899.

References

Unincorporated communities in Montgomery County, Ohio
Unincorporated communities in Ohio